Jorge José Winston Abbott Charme (born 1 October 1947) is a Chilean judge.

Biography

Family
He is the son of Eduardo Abbott Godoy and Luz Charme Montt, a gastronomic businesswoman member of the Montt family who also was leader of the Christian Democratic Party (DC).

His great-great-grandparents were Ambrosio Montt Luco, a deputy of the National Party, and Luz Montt Montt, daughter of Manuel Montt, president of Chile from 1851 and 1861. On his mother's side, he is the cousin of Alfredo Moreno Charme, Chilean businessman, politician and minister in both Sebastián Piñera's governments.

Studies
He studied at the Pontificia Universidad Católica de Valparaíso Law School and graduated on 31 July 1979. In his student days he was a member of the Christian Democratic Youth and the Popular Unitary Action Movement (MAPU).

Professional career
Abbott served as Deputy Director General of the Valparaíso Region Judicial Assistance Corporation from 1988 to 1990. Then, from 1992 to 2002, he was the General Director of that organ.

In late 2002, Abbott entered the Public Ministry during Ricardo Lagos' government. He was appointed Regional Prosecutor of the Valparaíso, a position he held from 2003 to 2010. From 2011 to 2014, he dedicated himself to the free practice of his legal profession. 

In 2014, he was appointed National Executive Director of the Public Ministry by the President Michelle Bachelet. A year later, Bachelet appointed him as National Prosecutor to replace Sabas Chahuán. Abbott took office on 1 December 2015.

References

External links
 Profile at Fiscalía de Chile

1947 births
Living people
20th-century Chilean judges
Christian Democratic Party (Chile) politicians
Popular Unitary Action Movement politicians
Pontifical Catholic University of Valparaíso alumni